Penicillium quebecense is a species of fungus in the genus Penicillium.

References

quebecense
Fungi described in 2011